The following lists events that happened during 1957 in Cape Verde.

Incumbents
Colonial governor:
Manuel Marques de Abrantes Amaral
António Augusto Peixoto Correia (acting governor)

Events

Births
June 11: António Paris, footballer

References

 
1957 in the Portuguese Empire
Years of the 20th century in Cape Verde
1950s in Cape Verde
Cape Verde
Cape Verde